George S. Hubert (1912 – 2 June 1974) was a cricketer who played on Ceylon's first tour in 1932-33.

Hubert attended Royal College, Colombo. He played for Tamil Union in Colombo as a stylish batsman who sometimes opened, and a brilliant fieldsman.

He took part in Ceylon's tour of India in 1932-33, when he batted well in some of the minor matches but was unsuccessful in the two games against India. Nevertheless he impressed I. M. Mansukhani, who reported on the tour for The Cricketer: "He did run risks, but he had no respect for mere names. He was a dashing bat indeed." 

His highest first-class score was 66 against Sir Julien Cahn's XI in 1936-37, his last first-class match. He was unable to go on Ceylon's second tour, to India in 1940-41.

He also represented Ceylon at hockey, playing against India in 1933.

References

External links

1912 births
1974 deaths 
Sri Lankan Tamil sportspeople
Sri Lankan cricketers
All-Ceylon cricketers
Alumni of Royal College, Colombo 
Tamil Union Cricket and Athletic Club cricketers
Sri Lankan field hockey players